Acleris pulchella is a species of moth of the family Tortricidae. It is found in Japan (Honshu).

The length of the forewings is 6 mm for males and 7–8 mm for females. The ground colour of the forewings is glossy pale canary-yellow, with scattered reddish brown striae. There is a narrow pale yellow costal area. The basal patch, band and fascia are dark reddish brown, suffused and mixed with glossy dark red-purple. The hindwings are brownish grey.

References

Moths described in 1963
pulchella
Moths of Japan